James Drane (1808–1869) was an American politician.

Early life
James Drane was born in 1808 in Columbia County, Georgia.

Career
Drane served in the Mississippi House of Representatives from 1836 to 1850. He went on to serve in the Mississippi State Senate from 1850 to 1865, including as its president from 1858 to 1865.

Drane also ran for Governor of Mississippi in 1857 and 1859.

Death
Drane died in 1869.

References

1808 births
1869 deaths
People from Columbia County, Georgia
People from Choctaw County, Mississippi
Members of the Mississippi House of Representatives
Mississippi state senators
19th-century American politicians